The Polaris FIB ("Flying Inflatable Boat") is an Italian flying boat ultralight trike, that was designed and produced by Polaris Motor of Gubbio. The aircraft was introduced in the mid-1980s and remained in production until about 2014. It was supplied as a complete ready-to-fly-aircraft.

It is now produced by New Polaris 2020 S.L. of Tenerife, Canary Islands, Spain.

Design and development

The aircraft features a cable-braced hang glider-style high-wing, weight-shift controls, a two-seats-in-tandem open cockpit, an inflatable boat hull and a single engine in pusher configuration. The FIB has no wheeled landing gear, but as a result of customer demand it was later developed into the amphibious Polaris AM-FIB.

The FIB's single surface wing is made from bolted-together aluminum tubing and covered in Dacron sailcloth. The  span wing is supported by a single tube-type kingpost and uses an "A" frame weight-shift control bar. The powerplant is a twin cylinder, liquid-cooled, two-stroke, dual-ignition  Rotax 582 engine.

The company continued to develop the design and in 2010 introduced a new hull shape to increase performance in the water and in the air.

Dimitri Delemarie, writing in The World Directory of Leisure Aviation 2011-12, said of the design, "It will never win any speed records, but if there were an award for fun, it would be right up there at the top."

Operational history
The FIB is used by a number of government operators, including police and coastguards.

Variants
In the early 2000s the company offered a version with the same wing, but without a boat hull, using a conventional minimalist trike frame mounted on wheeled landing gear or optionally skis. Even though it did not have a boat hull it was still marketed under the FIB name.

Specifications (FIB)

References

External links

1980s Italian sport aircraft
1980s Italian ultralight aircraft
Single-engined pusher aircraft
Ultralight trikes